João Pedro Oliveira Araújo (born 13 May 1987 in Lavra, Matosinhos), known as João Pedro, is a Portuguese professional footballer who plays for Leça F.C. as a left back.

References

1987 births
Living people
Sportspeople from Matosinhos
Portuguese footballers
Association football defenders
Liga Portugal 2 players
Segunda Divisão players
U.S.C. Paredes players
Leça F.C. players
C.D. Aves players
Leixões S.C. players
AD Fafe players
S.C. Olhanense players